María de los Ángeles Felisa Santamaría Espinosa (born 2 August 1947), professionally known as Massiel, is a Spanish pop singer. She won the Eurovision Song Contest 1968 with the song "La, la, la", beating the British pop singer Cliff Richard's "Congratulations".

She decided to abandon her music career in 1996, but released another album a year later and a further one in 2007, along with two new editions of 1970s albums.

Biography
Massiel was born in Madrid, Spain. Her Asturian father, Emilio Santamaria Martín, was an artistic manager, so she was around singers and groups from her earliest childhood, and at a young age she decided to become a singer, actress, and songwriter.

Her Asturian mother was Concepción Espinosa Peñas (1920-2011). 

Her first recordings were released in 1966: Di que no, No sé porqué, Llueve, No comprendo, Y sabes qué vi, Rufo el pescador, Aleluya and El era mi amigo. The song Rosas en el mar, written by her friend Luis Eduardo Aute in 1967, established her as a singer in Spain and Latin America. In 1967, she acted in the movie Vestida de novia.

On 29 March 1968 Massiel was asked to replace singer-songwriter Joan Manuel Serrat as Spain's representative at the Eurovision Song Contest. Serrat had intended to sing in Catalan, but the Francoist State would not allow this, insisting that the entry be performed in Castilian, in accordance with the language policies of Francoist Spain.

Nine days before the contest, Massiel was on tour in Mexico. She returned to Spain, learned the song, and recorded it in five languages. On April 6 in London, she beat the favorite, Cliff Richard with "Congratulations", by one point and won the contest. Her song, "La, la, la", was written by Ramón Arcusa and Manuel de la Calva. A 2008 Spanish documentary by La Sexta accused Spain's television company TVE of bribing judges on the orders of General Franco. This allegation was based on a statement by journalist José María Íñigo, who would later claim that he had repeated a widespread rumour and that his words had been taken out of context. Both Massiel and Íñigo accused La Sexta of manufacturing the scandal.

Some years later, she performed dramatic roles in theatrical productions like A los hombres futuros, yo Bertolt Brecht (1972), Corridos de la revolución: Mexico 1910 (1976) and Antonio and Cleopatra in the early 1980s. From 1966 to 1998, Massiel recorded songs of different genres for five record companies: Zafiro, PolyGram, Hispavox, Bat Discos and Emasstor. Her discography includes around 50 records released as EPs, singles, LPs, CDs and compilations. In 1997 she released a Spanish album called Baladas Y Canciones De Bertolt Brecht. Massiel returned in 1981 with a brand-new sound and a new record label, Hispavox. Her label début, Tiempos Dificiles, was a major comeback in Spain where songs like "El Amor", "Hello America" and covers of Mexican songs "Eres" (written by José María Napoleón) and "El Noa Noa" (written by Juan Gabriel) not only exposed Mexican talent in Spain but were very popular for the singer. Massiel would finish her pop comeback in 1983 with her career-defining record, Corazon De Hierro. Not only was this album successful in her native country, but it was also her reconciliation with Latin America. The song "Brindaremos Por El" was a massive hit worldwide and topped the charts in many countries. In many ways, Massiel came back to the continent that loved her so throughout the 1960s.

During the 1980s, Massiel was an invited artist at the Festival de Viña del Mar in Chile because of her local popularity. At the time Chile was under the rule of Augusto Pinochet. After singing for an hour, Massiel received the festival's most important prize, La Gaviota de Plata (The Silver Seagull). In her speech of gratitude she said: "Thank you Chile, I would like to let you know that Patricio Manns says hello from the Andes Mountains." The public cheered and celebrated her announcement as Patricio Manns is a well-known composer, poet and member of the Communist Party of Chile who was in exile in Sweden following the 11 September 1973 coup d'état against Salvador Allende.

She re-recorded her Eurovision winner "La, la, la" in 1997, with a 'hip-hop' beat, background singers, whistling and Spanish percussion. In 1998, Massiel appeared in the film Cantando a la Vida, which profiled a winner of a European Song festival suddenly disappearing. Massiel had the lead role of Maria and also sang the entire soundtrack to the film.

In 2001, Massiel fell out of the window of her second-floor flat while "trying to close the shutters" (although many speculate she fell while drunk) and was hospitalized briefly. In 2005, she appeared on the 50th Anniversary Special of the Eurovision Song Contest and sang the song that made her internationally famous. In 2007 she became a member of the Mission Eurovision jury, a show to select the Spanish song for the Eurovision Song Contest 2007. She made a short comeback to music on this show, singing "Busco un hombre", a song competing to be Spain's entry but to be sung by another singer. It had been 11 years since Massiel had been on stage.

In 2012, Massiel starred in the Spanish production of "Follies" by Stephen Sondheim under the direction of Mario Gas, in the role of Carlotta Campion, the yesteryear movie star who sings the iconic tune "I'm still here". The production ran from February to April at the Teatro Español in Madrid.

Discography
Some singles:
1966 "Di que no"
1966 "Él era mi amigo"/"Sé que ries al pensar"
1967 "Rosas en el mar" #1 Mexico
1967 "Aleluya Nº1" #1 Mexico
1967 "La moza de los ojos tristes"/"Mirlos, molinos y sol"
1968 "La La La"/"Pensamientos, sentimientos"
1968 "La La La (German version)" International
1968 "La La La"/Pensamientos, sentimientos" International
1968 "La La La"/"He gives me love (La La La English version)" International
1968 "La La La"/"Las estrellas lo sabrán" International
1968 "La La La"/"Rosas en el mar" International
1968 "Deja la flor"/"Sol de medianoche"
1968 "Las rocas y el mar"/"Vida y muerte"
1968 "Niños y hombres"/"A espaldas de mi pueblo"
1969 "Amén"/"Ay volar"
1970 "Cantan las sirenas"/"Canciones"
1970 "Detrás de la montaña"/Viejo marino"
1971 "Dormido amor"
1972 "Balada de Maria Sanders"/Balada de la comodidad"
1973 "Rompe los silencios"/"Corriendo, corriendo"
1977 "Tu me preguntas si soy feliz"/"Para vivir"
1981 "El Noa Noa"/"El Amor"
1982 "Eres/De 7 a 9"
1982 "Tiempos difíciles"/"Loca"
1983 "Marinero"/"Otra mujer"
1983 "Brindaremos por él"/"Ay la nena"
1983 "Más fuerte"/"Basta de peleas"
1984 "Acordeón"
1984 "Voy a empezar de nuevo"/"Te fuiste"
1985 "Vaca pagana"/"Popurrí"
1985 "Rosas en el mar"
1985 "Qué más quisiera yo"
1986 "Volverán"/"Hoy me he propuesto pensar en ti"
1986 "Lo que cambie por ti"/"Poco después de las 12 de un 20 de marzo"
1990 "Ese es mi pueblo"

Some albums and LPs:
1966 EP "Di que no"
1968 BSO "Cantando a la vida"
1970 Massiel en México
1972 Baladas de Bertolt Brecht
1972 Lo mejor de Massiel
1975 Viva
1976 Carabina 30-30
1977 Alineación
1981 Tiempos difíciles
1982 Rosas en el mar
1983 Corazón de hierro
1984 Sola en libertad
1985 Massiel en Des...Concierto
1986 Desde dentro
1990 Deslices
1997 Desátame
1997 Autoretrato: Lo mejor de Massiel
1998 Grandes Éxitos
1999 Todas sus grabaciones en Polydor (1976–1977)
2003 Sus primeros años (1966–1975) 2 CD's
2007 Massiel canta a Bertolt Brecht (CD + Book)
2008 Sus álbumes

References

External links

 The Ye-Ye Girls Website
 'Cantando a la Vida' on the Internet Movie Database
 Information on Massiel's near-fatal fall from a second-floor window 

1947 births
Living people
Singers from Madrid
Eurovision Song Contest winners
Eurovision Song Contest entrants for Spain
Spanish pop singers
Eurovision Song Contest entrants of 1968